The UK Rock & Metal Singles Chart is a record chart which ranks the best-selling rock and heavy metal songs in the United Kingdom. Compiled and published by the Official Charts Company, the data is based on each track's weekly physical sales, digital downloads and streams. In 2012, there were 14 singles that topped the 52 published charts. The first number-one single of the year was "Iris" by Goo Goo Dolls, which spent the first nine weeks of the year atop the chart. The final number-one single of the year was "The World Is Ugly", the third release from My Chemical Romance's compilation Conventional Weapons.

The most successful song on the UK Rock & Metal Singles Chart in 2012 was "Iris" by Goo Goo Dolls, which spent 23 weeks at number one across ten different spells. Linkin Park spent nine weeks at number one with "Burn It Down" (seven weeks) and "What I've Done" (two weeks), while You Me at Six were number one for five weeks with "The Swarm" (four weeks) and "Reckless" (one week). "Back in Black" by AC/DC was number one for five non consecutive weeks in 2012, "Bring Me to Life" by Evanescence spent three weeks atop the chart in two spells, and "45" by The Gaslight Anthem was number one for two weeks in 2012.

Chart history

See also
2012 in British music
List of UK Rock & Metal Albums Chart number ones of 2012

References

External links
Official UK Rock & Metal Singles Chart Top 40 at the Official Charts Company
The Official UK Top 40 Rock Singles at BBC Radio 1

2012 in British music
United Kingdom Rock and Metal Singles
2012